Paolo Pellizzari (born 1956), is an  Italian photographer living in Belgium. He specialises in crowds, human landscapes, he is a flaneur and observer of our world. He teaches author photography at La Cambre School of Art in Brussels and is a guest teacher at the ICP in New York.

Background

Paolo Pellizzari was born on February 7, 1956. His photographic work finds its roots in the German School of photography.  His panoramic pictures featuring crowds and human landscapes makes his work distinctive among others. He studied architecture at Université catholique de Louvain and Business at INSEAD (Fontainebleau). His work is shown in Museums and Art Galleries.

Before being a photographer, starting 1981, Paolo Pellizzari worked in the business world:

From 1981 to 1984, Pellizzari worked as a consultant at the Boston Consulting Group in France.  From 1984 to 1989 Paolo was the founder and general manager of the Kiel Corporation in New Hampshire. There, he designed hand-held computers with a touchscreen and a built-in modem. Ultimately, the company was sold to the Japanese company Murata. From 1989 to 1992, Pellizzari worked as an executive director of Neuhaus-Mondose in Belgium, overseeing the manufacturing of luxury chocolates. From 1992 to 1999, Pellizzari was the owner of Inducolor SA in Belgium and worked with the Venture Capital Arm of Li & Fung. After eight years of management, he sold Inducolor SA and quit the Business world.

Starting in 1999 he dedicated all his time to photography.and became an independent photographer. Italian born he lives in Belgium.

His first exhibition was in Brussels with Moving Art. He was awarded first prize for Grand Prix d’auteur Couleur de France. Followed an exhibition in Paris entitled Around the World and other group exhibitions on the same theme. 
In 2000 he published a book entitled La France du Tour and in 2005 "The Tours of the world". This book was awarded Best Sport Book of the year 2006.
In 2001, he had a solo exhibition at the Museum of modern art in Hasselt and entered into an agreement to cover the Tour de France, in the newspaper, Libération. 
In 2002, Paolo had two group exhibitions with the Museum of Photography in Charleroi and Recyclart. He published l'Equipe, Vélo Magazine and was photographer for Liberation at the World Soccer Cup. 
Later he had other exhibits at Couleur Café, at the Queen Galleries in Brussels for his work entitled One Billion Indians, at Young Gallery in Brussels, Husson, le Musée de la photographie in Charleroi and the Château d'Eau in Toulouse. 
In 2008 he worked on "Extrattitude.com", an initiative to promote as a photographer extraordinary people around the world. 
In 2008 and 2009 he directed two movies (Inspirations and The Proof of the Sun). 
In 2010 he produced a book with his body of work called The Broad Way'' and exhibited at the Italian Pavilion at the World Expo in Shanghai.
In 2011 after some time spend in Puerta del Sol in Madrid with the Indignados, he sponsored an initiative to create a dialogue web site called www.eskutcha.com.
In 2013 his work was shown in New York at Anastasia Photo Gallery.

Paolo Pellizzari teaches author photography at the International Center of Photography (ICP) in New York and at l'Ecole Nationale d'Art de Lacambre in Brussels Belgium. 
His work for the Press is distributed by Agence Vu in Paris and Contact Press Images in New York.

Publications
 2001 - La France du Tour (Editions Catleya)
 2003 - One Billion Indians (Editions 5 Continents Milan)
 2005 - Tours of The World (Editions 5 Continents Milan)
 2006 - Family Shops (Editions 5 Continents Milan)
 2007 - Paris Metro (Editions Michel Husson Brussels)
 2009 - 9*20 (Editions Edern Brussels )
 2011 - The Broad Way (Eyetopic and Petercam )

External links
 

1956 births
Italian photographers
Living people